Robert Sturton, Vicar of Kinsale and Prebendary of Desertmore, was Dean of Ross, Ireland  from 1791 until 1796.  he was also Archdeacon of Cork from 1793 and died  at Clifton, Bristol on May Day 1796.

References

Deans of Ross, Ireland